Banko (Bambara: ߓߊߣߞߏ tr. Banko) is a rural commune and village in the Cercle of Dioïla in the Koulikoro Region of south-western Mali. The village lies on the Banifing River. The commune contains 31 villages.

References

External links
.

Communes of Koulikoro Region